WSCD-FM (92.9 FM) is a radio station licensed to Duluth, Minnesota, serving the Duluth-Superior area.  The station is owned by Minnesota Public Radio (MPR), and airs MPR's "Classical Music Network", originating from KSJN in Minneapolis/St. Paul.

WSCD broadcasts in HD.

On January 20, 2016, MPR announced that WSCD translator 90.9 W215CG and WSCN-HD2 would air its adult album alternative network The Current beginning February 1, 2016. Programming will primarily originate from KCMP in Minneapolis, but local programs will also be included.

See also
 Minnesota Public Radio

References

External links
WSCD page at Minnesota Public Radio

Radio stations in Minnesota
Minnesota Public Radio
Classical music radio stations in the United States
NPR member stations